The concept of an abstract Wiener space is a mathematical construction developed by Leonard Gross to understand the structure of Gaussian measures on infinite-dimensional spaces. The construction emphasizes the fundamental role played by the Cameron–Martin space. The classical Wiener space is the prototypical example.

The structure theorem for Gaussian measures states that all Gaussian measures can be represented by the abstract Wiener space construction.

Motivation

Let  be a real Hilbert space, assumed to be infinite dimensional and separable. In the physics literature, one frequently encounters integrals of the form 

Such integrals arise, notably, in the context of the Euclidean path-integral formulation of quantum field theory. At a mathematical level, such an integral cannot be interpreted as integration against a measure on the original Hilbert space . On the other hand, suppose  is a Banach space that contains  as a dense subspace. In that case, the pair  is referred to as an abstract Wiener space.

The original subspace  is called the Cameron–Martin space, which forms a set of measure zero with respect to the Wiener measure.

What the preceding example means is that we have a formal expression for the Wiener measure given by

(Brownian paths are known to be nowhere differentiable with probability one.) 

One of the appealing features of Gross's abstract Wiener space construction is that it takes  as the starting point and treats  as an auxiliary object.

(See the Cameron–Martin theorem.)

Mathematical description

Cylinder set measure on 

Let  be a Hilbert space defined over the real numbers, assumed to be infinite dimensional and separable. Then we can consider the set

Any set of this type is called a cylinder set. The collection of all cylinder sets forms an algebra of sets in  but it is not a -algebra.

There is a natural way of defining a "measure" on cylinder sets, as follows. In light of the Gram–Schmidt procedure, it is harmless to assume that  are orthonormal. That is, we define

Nonexistence of the measure on 

One can understand the difficulty by considering the behavior of the standard Gaussian measure on  given by

The expectation value of the squared norm with respect to this measure is computed as an elementary Gaussian integral as

(The typical distance from the origin would be infinite, so that the measure would not actually live on the space .)

Existence of the measure on 

The upshot of this whole discussion is that Gaussian integrals of the sort described in the motivation section do have a rigorous mathematical interpretation, but they do not live on the space whose norm occurs in the exponent of the formal expression. Rather, they live on some larger space.

Universality of the construction

The abstract Wiener space construction is not simply one method of building Gaussian measures. Rather, every Gaussian measure on an infinite-dimensional Banach space occurs in this way. (See the structure theorem for Gaussian measures.)

Properties

  is a Borel measure: it is defined on the Borel σ-algebra generated by the open subsets of B.
  is a Gaussian measure in the sense that f∗() is a Gaussian measure on R for every linear functional , .
 Hence,  is strictly positive and locally finite.
 The behaviour of  under translation is described by the Cameron–Martin theorem.
 If H (and B) are infinite dimensional, then the image of H has measure zero. This fact is a consequence of Kolmogorov's zero–one law.

Example: Classical Wiener space

The prototypical example of an abstract Wiener space is the space of continuous paths, and is known as classical Wiener space.

with inner product given by

See also

References 

  (See section 1.1)
 
 

Measure theory
Stochastic processes